Here is a list of the hottest and coldest temperatures ever recorded in various locations in Sweden since 1860. Due to the continental nature of the Swedish climate, the entire country is prone to absolute extremes, even though averages are normally moderate in most of the country.

Highest temperatures ever recorded in Sweden

Highest temperature readings (provincial records)

Lowest temperatures ever recorded in Sweden

Lowest temperature readings (provincial records)

Highest temperature of every year in Stockholm, 2000-2022 

 2000: 27,3°C (20 June) 
 2001: 31,8°C (4 July) 
 2002: 31,0°C (17 July) 
 2003: 30,8°C (1 August) 
 2004: 30,6°C (8 August) 
 2005: 32,1°C (12 July) 
 2006: 32,9°C (6 July)
 2007: 31,5°C (9 June) 
 2008: 31,3°C (26 July) 
 2009: 30,6°C (2 July) 
 2010: 32,5°C (11 July) 
 2011: 29,0°C (2 July) 
 2012: 27,0°C (25 July) 
 2013: 29,4°C (26 July)
 2014: 31,9°C (24 July) 
 2015: 30,1°C (2 July) 
 2016: 29,8°C (25 June) 
 2017: 28,9°C (28 May) 
 2018: 33,5°C (26 July)
 2019: 32,0°C (28 July) 
 2020: 30,6°C (25 June) 
 2021: 33,1°C (15 July) 
 2022: 34,5°C (21 July)

Notes

External links
Svenska temperaturrekord

Climate of Sweden
Sweden-related lists
Sweden